Widows is a British primetime television crime drama that was broadcast in 1983 and 1985, produced by Euston Films for Thames Television and aired on the ITV network. Two six-part series were written by crime writer Lynda La Plante. The executive producer for the series was Verity Lambert. In 1984 it was nominated for the British Academy Television Award for Best Drama Series or Serial.

Plot
Three armed robbers — Harry Rawlins, Terry Miller, and Joe Perelli — are killed during an armed robbery. They are survived by their widows, Dolly Rawlins (Ann Mitchell), Shirley Miller (Fiona Hendley), and Linda Perelli (Maureen O'Farrell). With the police applying pressure, and a rival gang intending to take over Harry Rawlins' crime business, the widows turn to Dolly for leadership.

She uses Harry's famous "ledgers", a cache of books detailing all his robberies over the years, to find the details of the failed robbery, and, enlisting the help of a fourth woman, Bella O'Reilly (Eva Mottley), they resolve to pull off the raid themselves. At the same time, they discover the "fourth man" in the raid escaped—leaving their husbands for dead. Dolly must contend with the police and the gang, as well as her fellow widows, agitating for vengeance.

The first series of Widows concluded with the widows pulling off the raid, and escaping to Rio. In the final scenes, they discovered that the "fourth man" was in fact Harry Rawlins (Maurice O'Connell), Dolly's husband.

A second series followed in 1985. This series saw the widows return from Rio to track down Harry Rawlins, revealed at the conclusion of the original Widows to be the surviving "fourth man" from the original raid. Harry is determined to pay back the widows for staging his raid, and the widows have a score to settle with him for running out on their husbands.

Actress Eva Mottley left the production before the second series, claiming that she had been sexually and racially abused by the production staff. She died by suicide soon after. Debby Bishop took over the role of Bella for series 2.

A sequel series, She's Out, set ten years after the events of Widows, was produced in 1995.

Cast

Major cast
 Ann Mitchell as Dolly Rawlins 
 Maureen O'Farrell as Linda Perelli 
 Fiona Hendley as Shirley Miller 
 Eva Mottley as Bella O'Reilly (Series 1)
 Debby Bishop as Bella O'Reilly (Series 2)
 Kate Williams as Audrey Withey 
 Maurice O'Connell as Harry Rawlins
 David Calder as D.I. George Resnick 
 Paul Jesson as D.S./D.I. Alec Fuller

Supporting cast

Series 1
 Peter Machin as D.C. Robin Andrews
 Jeffrey Chiswick as Arnie Fisher
 George Costigan as Charlie Staincliffe
 Stanley Meadows as Eddie Rawlins
 Carol Gillies as Alice Gunner
 Dudley Sutton as Boxer Davis
 Terry Cowling as Jimmy Nunn
 Christopher Ellison as Tony Fisher
 Terence Harvey as Chief Insp. Saunders
 James Lister as Carlos Moreno
 Catherine Neilson as Trudie Nunn
 Peter Lovstrom as Greg Withey
 Michael John Paliotti as Joe Perelli
 Terry Stuart as Terry Miller

Series 2
 Stephen Yardley as Vic Morgan
 Andrew Kazamia as Micky Tesco
 Peter Machin as D.C. Robin Andrews
 Mike Felix as Eddie Bates
 Peter Lovstrom as Greg Withey
 Christopher Whitehouse as Gordon Murphy
 Pavel Douglas as D.S. Tommy Reynolds
 Damien Thomas as Jose Camarena
 Jim Carter as D.I. Frinton
 Ann Michelle as Jackie Rawlins
 Terence Harvey as Chief Insp. Saunders
 Catherine Neilson as Trudie Nunn

Episode list

Series 1 (1983)

Series 2 (1985)

In other media

American remake 
In 2002, the first series was re-made for the American market, but the plot was significantly changed. Instead of a traditional armed robbery, this version united the three widows and the fourth woman in a plan to steal a famous painting. This version starred Mercedes Ruehl as Dolly Rawlins, Brooke Shields as Shirley Heller, Rosie Perez as Linda Perelli, and N'Bushe Wright as Bella O'Reilly. The miniseries aired on ABC between August 6 and August 27, 2002 and is produced by Patchett/Kaufman Entertainment, in association with Greengrass Productions and distributed by Buena Vista Television.

Film adaptation 

Steve McQueen directed a film adaptation, and co-wrote the screenplay with Gillian Flynn. New Regency produce the film. In September 2016 Viola Davis was announced as starring as Dolly Rawlins. In January 2017, André Holland and Cynthia Erivo were announced as starring in the film. Elizabeth Debicki was in talks to join the film in February 2017. The same month, Michelle Rodriguez and Daniel Kaluuya were named among the cast. In March 2017, Liam Neeson was in discussions to star as Viola Davis' husband, and subsequently joined the cast. Robert Duvall joined the cast in April, as did Garret Dillahunt, Jacki Weaver, Manuel Garcia-Rulfo and Lukas Haas in May 2017. Carrie Coon was cast in June 2017, with Michael Harney and Jon Bernthal announced as cast members a month later.  Principal photography began on May 8, 2017.

Home media
The series was initially made available on VHS via Fremantle Home Entertainment; "Series One" was released on 13 May 2002, while "Series Two" was made available on 8 July 2002.

The Complete Series of Widows was released on DVD, first from Fremantle, on 19 April 2010, and again from Revelation Films, with the addition of the sequel series She's Out (which is included in all subsequent releases), then from Network on 5 November 2018.

On 5 November 2018, Network also released the complete series on standard definition Blu-ray.

References

External links
 Widows at the Internet Movie Database
 Widows 2 at the Internet Movie Database
 Encyclopedia of Television

1980s British drama television series
1983 British television series debuts
1985 British television series endings
1980s British crime television series
ITV television dramas
Television shows produced by Thames Television
Television series by Fremantle (company)
Television shows set in London
Television series by Euston Films
English-language television shows